Gareth Myles is a British academic economist. He was born in Manchester and educated at the University of Warwick, the London School of Economics and Nuffield College, Oxford.

References

Academics of the University of Exeter
Living people
Year of birth missing (living people)
British economists
Alumni of Nuffield College, Oxford